Siratus tenuivaricosus is a species of sea snail, a marine gastropod mollusk in the family Muricidae, the murex snails or rock snails.

Description

Distribution

References

 Kiener, L.-C., 1842-43 Genre Rocher (Murex), Linné. Volume 7. In: Spécies général et iconographie des coquilles vivantes. Famille des canalifères, p. 130 pp
 Houart, R. (2014). Living Muricidae of the world. Muricinae. Murex, Promurex, Haustellum, Bolinus, Vokesimurex and Siratus. Harxheim: ConchBooks. 197 pp.

Muricidae
Gastropods described in 1927